David Warshofsky (born David A. Warner; February 23, 1961) is an American film, television and stage actor.

Life and career
Warshofsky was born David A. Warner in San Francisco, California. He changed his surname back to "Warshofsky", which was his family's original name. Since 1989, Warshofsky has appeared in films and television series, such as episodes of Law & Order, ER, Commander in Chief, Without a Trace, The Mentalist, and Tarzan, and films such as Running Scared, Welcome to Collinwood, The Bone Collector, Face/Off, Unstoppable, and There Will Be Blood.

Warshofsky lives in Los Angeles with his wife and two children.

Warshofsky is Jewish.

Filmography

Film

 Last Exit to Brooklyn (1989) – Mike
 Suffering Bastards (1989) – Al Johnson
 Family Business (1989) – Lawyer's Parking Attendant
 Born on the Fourth of July (1989) – Lieutenant – Vietnam
 Home Improvement (1991, TV Series) – Fireman #1
 Afterburn (1992, TV Movie) – Tiger
 Skinner (1995) – Geoff Tate
 NYPD Blue (1995, TV Series) – Bruce Kriege
 JAG (1997, TV Series) – Blake, USS Cayuga's Executive Officer
 Chicago Hope (1997, TV Series) – Joseph Bonora
 Face/Off (1997) – Bomb Leader
 G.I. Jane (1997) – Sgt. Johns, Instructor
 Cracker (1997, TV Series) – Bartender
 Brooklyn South (1998, TV Series) – Barman
 A Bright Shining Lie (1998, TV Movie) – Terry Pike
 ER (1998, TV Series)
 The Minus Man (1999) – Detective Pate
 The Bone Collector (1999) – Amelia's Partner
 Mondo Picasso (1999, TV Series) – Captain Tam
 Friends (2000, TV Series) – Fireman #2
 Endsville (2000) – Doug
 The Sopranos (2001, TV Series) – Cop #2
 Human Nature (2001) – Police Detective
 Don't Say a Word (2001) – Ryan
 Law & Order (2001–2007, TV Series) – Danny Miller
 Personal Velocity: Three Portraits (2002) – Kurt Wurtzle
 Welcome to Collinwood (2002) – Sergeant Babitch
 Fight or Flight (2003, Short) – Lawerence
 Medal of Honor: Rising Sun (2003, Video Game) – (voice) (as Dave Warshofsky)
 Tarzan (2003, TV Series) – Sheriff Tim Sweeney (1 episode)
 Without a Trace (2004, TV Series)
 The Best Thief in the World (2004) – Paul Zaidman
 Running Scared (2006) – Lester the Pimp
 Commander in Chief (2006, TV Series) – Frank Terzano
 Walkout (2006, TV Movie) – Lloyd Hurley
 Scrubs (2006, TV Series) – Dave Bradford
 Law & Order: Criminal Intent (2006, TV Series) – Officer Ray Wiznesky
 The Hunter (2007, Short) – Frank
 Numbers (2007, TV Series) – Detective Jack Collins
 Cough Drop (2007, Short) – Greg Pierson
 There Will be Blood (2007) – H.M. Tilford
 Taken (2008) – Bernie
 Generation Kill (2008, TV Mini-Series) – Battalion Commander
 American Violet (2008) – Robert Foster
 Public Enemies (2009) – Warden Baker
 The Mentalist (2009-2011, TV Series) – Donny Culpepper 
 Fair Game (2010) – Pete
 Unstoppable (2010) – Judd Stewart
 The Future (2011) – Marshall
 Little Birds (2011) – Joseph Hoffman
 Small Apartments (2012) – Detective Holman
 The Master (2012) – Philadelphia Police
 Lincoln (2012) –  William Hutton
 Now You See Me (2013) – Cowan
 Captain Phillips (2013) – Mike Perry
 The Two Faces of January (2014) – Paul Vittorio
 Taken 3 (2014) – Bernie
 Stockholm, Pennsylvania (2015) – Glen Dargon
 Battle Creek (2015, TV Series) – Agent Bromberg
 Now You See Me 2 (2016) – Agent Cowan
 Fear The Walking Dead (2016) – George Geary
 Wilson (2017) – Olsen
 Beatriz at Dinner (2017) – Grant
 Feed (2017) – Dr. Rothstein
 It's Not About Jimmy Keene (2019) – Joel

References

External links
 

1961 births
Living people
Jewish American male actors
20th-century American male actors
21st-century American male actors
Male actors from San Francisco
American male film actors
American male television actors
American male voice actors
People from the San Francisco Bay Area
21st-century American Jews